SpySheriff is malware that disguises itself as anti-spyware software. It attempts to mislead the user with false security alerts, threatening them into buying the program. Like other rogue antiviruses, after producing a list of false threats, it prompts the user to pay to remove them. The software is particularly difficult to remove, since it nests its components in System Restore folders, and also blocks some system management tools. However, SpySheriff can be removed by an experienced user, antivirus software, or by using a rescue disk.

Websites

SpySheriff was hosted at both www.spysheriff.com and www.spy-sheriff.com, which operated from 2005 until their shutdown in 2008. Both domains are now parked. Several other similarly-named websites also hosted the program but have all been shut down. Several typosquatted websites also attempted to automatically install SpySheriff, including a fake version of Google.com called Goggle.com. From 2015, Goggle.com (which had changed ownership following a lawsuit by Google) hosted a survey scam and displayed links to Amazon items. In 2017, the domain hosted a blank page, with only the word "goggle" in its HTML script. At the beginning of 2018, the site redirected to the scam site tango-deg.com and others; however, from October 2018, it existed as a simple HTML markup with a top-level heading reading, "Goggle.com Inc.". In late 2019, the website became a WordPress blog about the 2020 United States presidential election. The blog credits itself with accurately predicting the outcome of the election.

Features of a SpySheriff infection

 SpySheriff is designed to behave like genuine antispyware software. Its user interface features a progress bar and counts allegedly found threats, but its scan results are deliberately false, with cryptic names such as "Trojan VX …" to mislead and scare the user.
 Removal attempts may be unsuccessful and SpySheriff may reinstall itself.
 The desktop background may be replaced with an image resembling a Blue Screen of Death, or a notice reading, "SPYWARE INFECTION! Your system is infected with spyware. Windows recommends that you use a spyware removal tool to prevent loss of data. Using this PC before having it cleaned of spyware threats is highly discouraged."
 Attempts to remove SpySheriff via Add or Remove Programs in Control Panel either fails or causes the computer to restart unexpectedly.
 Attempts to connect to the Internet in any Web browser is blocked by SpySheriff. Spy-Sheriff.com becomes the only accessible website, and can be opened through the program's control panel.
 Attempts to remove SpySheriff via System Restore are blocked as it prevents the calendar and restore points from loading. Users can overcome this by undoing the previous restore operation, after which the system will restore itself, allowing for easier removal of SpySheriff.
 SpySheriff can detect certain antispyware and antivirus programs running on the machine, and disable them by ending their processes as soon as it detects them. This may prevent its detection and removal by legitimate antivirus programs.
 SpySheriff can disable Task Manager and Registry Editor, preventing the user from ending its active process or removing its registry entries from Windows. Renaming the 'regedit' and 'taskmgr' executables will solve this problem.

See also
 Rogue security software
 Trojan horse (computing)

Notes

References

External links
 
 http://www.bleepingcomputer.com/forums/topic22402.html
 https://web.archive.org/web/20120401221555/http://www.microsoft.com/security/portal/Threat/Encyclopedia/Entry.aspx?Name=Program%3AWin32%2FSpySheriff

Windows trojans
Scareware
Rogue software